The Hanakaoe Burial Platform is a heiau site located in Kahuku, Oahu island, Hawaii.

The site consists of a triangular rock platform which was used as a burial site, as well as some associated structures. It was added to the National Register of Historic Places on August 14, 1973.

See also
Heiau sites in Hawaii

References

Heiau
History of Oahu
Archaeological sites on the National Register of Historic Places in Hawaii
Buildings and structures in Honolulu County, Hawaii
National Register of Historic Places in Honolulu County, Hawaii
1973 establishments in Hawaii
Protected areas established in 1973